Capital Gay was a weekly free gay newspaper published in London founded by Graham McKerrow and Michael Mason. The first issue was published on 26 June 1981, during Pride Week, and folded with the issue dated 30 June 1995. Despite its name it was also distributed in Brighton and had a combined circulation, in the two cities, of around 20,000 at the time when publication ceased.

McKerrow and Mason met while working at Gay News and designed Capital Gay as a complementary publication. Capital Gay had a shorter production time, 24 hours, and came out more frequently, every week, compared with Gay News which was fortnightly. The aim was to provide a news service for London and Brighton particularly for users of the growing commercial lesbian and gay scene and to provide a link between the political movement and the commercial scene and facilitate swifter political responses by the LGBT movement than had previously been possible. The news pages covered politics and non-political news while regular contributors provided comment and analysis.

Capital Gay sponsored the London Lesbian and Gay Switchboard and involved itself in events in the wider gay community in London; its editorial line tended to be strong. It is credited by the Oxford English Dictionary with being the first publication in the world to use the term HIV, (the second being the international science journal Nature), with the first regular column on AIDS in the world being written in Capital Gay by Julian Meldrum in 1984. For some years, with no reliable information on the threat of AIDS publicly available in the medical or national press, Capital Gay widened its distribution to cover cities with large gay populations including Manchester and Brighton. Copies were sent by rail and  distributed to local clubs, bars and hotels by volunteers.

During the controversy over Section 28 in December 1987, the paper's offices were targeted in an arson attack. After being accused by Labour MP Tony Banks of legitimising the incident, Conservative Member of Parliament Dame Elaine Kellett-Bowman was quoted in Hansard as saying: "I am quite prepared to affirm that it is quite right that there should be an intolerance of evil."

Editors 

 Graham McKerrow
 Michael Mason
 Gillian Rodgerson
 Simon Edge

References 

1981 establishments in England
Buildings and structures in the United Kingdom destroyed by arson
Defunct newspapers published in the United Kingdom
LGBT culture in London
LGBT-related newspapers published in the United Kingdom
London newspapers
Newspapers established in 1981
Publications disestablished in 1995